John Skinner (c. 1535 – 1584), of Reigate, Surrey was an English politician.

He was a Member (MP) of the Parliament of England for Reigate in 1559
and 1572.

References

1535 births
1584 deaths
People from Reigate
English MPs 1559
English MPs 1572–1583